Languages and dialects spoken in the Serbian province of Vojvodina include South Slavic languages (Serbian, Croatian, Bunjevac dialect, Macedonian), West Slavic languages (Slovak), East Slavic languages (Rusyn), Hungarian, Romanian, Romani, and others.

Historical overview

It is unknown which languages were spoken in the territory of present-day Vojvodina in paleolithic and neolithic times. First speakers of Indo-European languages arrived here in 4200 BC and since the first written traces about this region appeared, there are records about speakers of various Indo-European languages that lived in this area, including speakers of Thracian, Illyrian, Celtic, Iranian and Italic branches of Indo-European language family. The decline and fall of the Roman Empire brought to this area speakers of Turkic and Germanic languages as well. Speakers of South Slavic languages settled in the area in the 6th century, while speakers of Hungarian appeared in the 9th century. Ottoman conquest of the region in the 16th century brought to this area speakers of Turkish, Romani, and other languages, while Habsburg conquest in the end of the 17th and first half of the 18th century brought here the speakers of German, Slovak, Rusyn, Czech, Ukrainian and other languages. In recent years, there is an increasing number of speakers of Chinese language as well.

2011 census

According to the 2011 census, main languages spoken in Vojvodina were:
Serbian: 1,485,791 (76.91%)
Hungarian: 241,164 (12.48%)
Slovak: 47,760 (2.47%)
Romani: 27,430 (1.42%)
Romanian: 24,133 (1.25%)
Croatian: 14,576 (0.75%)
Rusyn: 11,154 (0.58%)

Usage of minority languages

Besides Serbian, which is the official language in the whole country, there are five regional languages in the official use by the provincial administration in Vojvodina: Hungarian, Romanian, Slovak, Rusyn, and Croatian. The Serbian language is used in all municipality governments, while minority languages are used in selected municipality governments. The Serbian language with Cyrillic script is in official use in all 45 municipalities of Vojvodina. The Hungarian language is in official use in 29 municipalities, Slovak in 12, Romanian in 9, Rusyn in 6, and Croatian and Czech in 1 municipality each (however, the Czech language is not official at provincial level).

Radio Television of Vojvodina, the public broadcaster in the province, broadcasts programme in 10 languages: Serbian, Hungarian, Slovak, Rusyn, Romanian, Bunjevac dialect, Ukrainian, Romani, Croatian, and Macedonian. Certain TV shows are also translated into Sign language.

Maps

See also
Languages of Serbia
List of Hungarian exonyms in Vojvodina
German exonyms (Vojvodina)

Notes

 
Languages of Serbia
Languages of Europe